Yajin, also known as shijian er, is a type of Chinese accessory which is placed at the lapels of Chinese clothing (robes and jackets); they would typically hanged down on the right side (sometimes at the front depending on the clothing closure) of the chest area in order to press on the clothing. The yajin appeared as early as the Tang dynasty and became popular in the Ming and Qing dynasties. Yajin can also be used as accessories on the cheongsam, where it is tied on the pankou knots.

Construction and design

Pendant-style yajin 
The pendant-style yajin may consist of string of beads, metal chains, and pendants (including precious stones, yupei-like materials, or metal filigree) which comes in various shapes such as flowers, animals, and auspicious motifs/ themes/ Chinese characters. It may also include tassels. In the late Qing, people sometimes used old silver coins to make their yajin.

In Qing dynasty, Han Chinese women also wore pendant-like charms made of diverse materials (such as jade, amber, gold) at the top button on the side of their ao jackets. They also wore other forms of pendants, such as pendants made of metal filigree in the shape of potpourri container which would be filled with fragrant herbs and long silver pendants with small silver charms which were filled with bells which would frightened evil spirits away when they tickled as they wore. They would also hang purses on the top button of their jacket.

Shibazi-style yajin 
A  is a type of 18-beads bracelet which originated from the japamala and could also be used as a form of yajin. Shibazi sometimes have hanging buckles; they would be hung on the right lapels of the clothing or could be worn around the wrist like a regular bracelet. There were no strict regulations on its wearing etiquette.

Depictions and media 
Yajin are sometimes depicted in Chinese television drama, especially Qing dynasty Court drama:

 Nothing Gold Can Stay (2017)
 Ruyi's Royal Love in the Palace (2018)
 Story of Yanxi Palace (2018)

Similar items 

 Jinbu - A Chinese waist accessory used to press clothing down; it is an ensemble of yupei (jade pendants)
 Norigae - a Korean clothing accessory

See also 

 Qizhuang
 Ruqun
 Chaozhu (Court necklace)
 Longhua (collar)
 Hanfu accessories

References 

Chinese traditional clothing
Chinese art